Estradiol 3-glucuronide (E2-3G), also known as 17β-estradiol 3-(β-D-glucuronide), is a naturally occurring and endogenous estrogen conjugate. It is specifically the C3 glucuronide conjugate of estradiol, the major estrogen in the body. It is formed from estradiol in the liver by UDP-glucuronosyltransferase via attachment of glucuronic acid and is eventually excreted in urine and bile. Similarly to estrogen sulfates like estrone sulfate, estrogen glucuronides have much higher water solubility than do unconjugated estrogens like estradiol.

Estrogen glucuronides can be deconjugated into the corresponding free estrogens by β-glucuronidase in tissues that express this enzyme, such as the mammary gland. As a result, estrogen glucuronides have estrogenic activity via conversion into estrogens.

Estradiol 3-glucuronide is a positional isomer of estradiol 17β-glucuronide.

See also
 Catechol estrogen
 Estradiol sulfate
 Estriol glucuronide
 Estriol sulfate
 Estrogen conjugate
 Lipoidal estradiol

References

External links
 Metabocard for 3-Estradiol Glucuronide - Human Metabolome Database

Estradiol esters
Estrogens
Glucuronide esters
Human metabolites